Herb Jones (28 August 1915 – 19 June 1992) was  a former Australian rules footballer who played with North Melbourne in the Victorian Football League (VFL).

Notes

External links 
		

1915 births
1992 deaths
Australian rules footballers from Victoria (Australia)
North Melbourne Football Club players